Confessions of a Teen Idol is an American reality series that began airing on VH1 on January 4, 2009 and concluded on February 22, 2009.  It ran for eight episodes.  The series was hosted and produced by former teen idols Scott Baio and Jason Hervey. The show was filmed in the same house used to film The Real World: Hollywood.

Synopsis
The series chronicles the current careers of seven former teen idols and their attempts to get back into the limelight.

Cast
 Christopher Atkins (47) – most notable for his roles in The Blue Lagoon, The Pirate Movie and A Night in Heaven & Dallas
 David Chokachi (41) – most notable for his role in the TV series Baywatch
 Billy Hufsey (50) – most notable for his role in the TV series Fame
 Jeremy Jackson (28) – most notable for his role in Baywatch as the son of David Hasselhoff's character
 Eric Nies (37) – most notable for his role in the first season of the TV reality show The Real World and as the host of The Grind
 Jamie Walters (39) – most notable for his #1 single "How Do You Talk to an Angel" and his role in the TV series Beverly Hills, 90210
 Adrian Zmed (54) – most notable for his roles in the TV series TJ Hooker and in the movies Bachelor Party and Grease 2
 Dr. Cooper Lawrence – Fame Expert/Therapist on the show and Author of The Cult of Celebrity

Episodes

References

External links
 
 

2009 American television series debuts
2009 American television series endings
2000s American reality television series
VH1 original programming
English-language television shows
Television shows set in Los Angeles
Television series by Banijay